Joseph Sternberg (1852 – 13 January 1928) was an English-born Australian politician.

He was born in Whitechapel, London, the son of German Jews Alexander Sternberg (1822–1882) from Rawicz, Prussia; and Frederica (Recka or Rivka) Platt. He arrived in Melbourne, Victoria on 18 February 1861 and grew up in Rochester. He became a farmer and an auctioneer, the latter in partnership with his brother. In 1880, he married Selina Lazarus, with whom he had two children. In 1891, he was elected to the Victorian Legislative Council for Northern Province. He transferred to the new Bendigo Province in 1904. Sternberg remained in the Council as a Liberal and then a Nationalist until his death in Melbourne in 1928.

References

1852 births
1928 deaths
Nationalist Party of Australia members of the Parliament of Victoria
Members of the Victorian Legislative Council
English emigrants to Australia
Australian Jews
People from Whitechapel
Date of birth missing
Australian people of German-Jewish descent